Kent Kinnear (born November 30, 1966) is a former professional tennis player from the United States.

Kinnear enjoyed most of his tennis success while playing doubles. During his career, he won four doubles titles and finished runner-up an additional 15 times. He achieved a career-high doubles ranking of World No. 24 in 1992.

Career finals

Doubles (4 wins, 15 losses)

External links
 
 

1966 births
Living people
American male tennis players
Clemson Tigers men's tennis players
Sportspeople from Naperville, Illinois
Tennis people from Illinois